= Lester Vonderschmidt =

Lester Allan Vonderschmidt was a lawyer and state legislator in Missouri. A Republican he served in the Missouri House of Representatives in 1953.

He was photographed with Harry Truman in Jefferson City, Missouri.

He attended the University of Missouri. He lived in Craig in Holt County.
